Jean-Marc Jaumin (born 5 February 1970) is a Belgian retired basketball player and current head coach for Circus Brussels of the BNXT League.

Coaching career
After being an assistant-coach for two years with BC Oostende, the club Jaumin also played for, Jaumin became head coach in 2010. In 2011, he was fired.

Jaumin signed a one-year contract with Den Helder Kings in 2012. In December 2012, he signed for 4 more years in Den Helder. Eight games into the 2014–15 season, Jaumin resigned after Kings didn't pay his salary caused by financial problems of the club. He later returned, but the club was eventually declared bankrupt.

In 2015, he signed with Lugano Tigers in the Swiss LNBA.

In 2016, Jaumin signed with Lions de Genève for the 2016–17 season.

In April 2017, Jaumin was announced as the new head coach of Okapi Aalstar. In March 2019, Jaumin parted ways with Okapi after disappointing results.

Jaumin signed with New Heroes Den Bosch for the 2019–20 season.

On 19 October 2021 he signed with Phoenix Brussels of the BNXT League.

References

External links
Dutch Basketball League profile 

1970 births
Living people
Apollon Patras B.C. players
Baloncesto Málaga players
BC Oostende players
Belfius Mons-Hainaut players
Belgian basketball coaches
Belgian expatriate basketball people in Spain
Belgian expatriate basketball people in Greece
Belgian men's basketball players
Brussels Basketball coaches
CB Gran Canaria players
Den Helder Kings coaches
Belgian expatriate basketball people in Switzerland
Heroes Den Bosch coaches
Liga ACB players
Okapi Aalstar coaches
Point guards
Real Madrid Baloncesto players
Belgian expatriate basketball people in the Netherlands